The Azad Jammu & Kashmir Election Commission (Urdu: آزاد جموں و کشمیر الیکشن کمیشن; AJKEC) is an independent, autonomous, permanent and constitutionally established body responsible for organizing and conducting elections to the Azad Jammu and Kashmir Legislative Assembly, Kashmir council, local governments, and the office of President of Azad Kashmir, as well as the delimitation of constituencies and preparation of electoral rolls. In accordance with the principles set down in the Interim Constitution of AJK, the commission makes the necessary measures to guarantee that the election is conducted honestly, justly, fairly, and in compliance with the law, and that corrupt practices are prevented. 

The Election Commission was established in1969, and has undergone numerous restructuring and reformations throughout history of Interim Constitution of AJK.

Function and duties 
The Interim Constitution of AJK defines and establishes the roles and responsibilities of the Azad Jammu & Kashmir Election Commission (AJKEC) in sub article (7) of article 50, which gives the commission the following responsibilities:

 Establishing and annually reviewing electoral records for elections to the Azad Jammu and Kashmir Legislative Assembly.
 Coordinating and holding elections for the Azad Jammu and Kashmir Legislative Assembly as well as filling temporary vacancies in legislative assembly or house.
 Elections for local body government institutions are to be planned and held.
 Election Tribunals are to be appointed.
 Upon receiving a reference from the Speaker, or head of the political party, as applicable to decide cases of disqualification of members of legislative assembly under the Interim Constitution of AJK.
 To organize and carry out the presidential election in accordance with Interim Constitution of AJK.
 Referendums are to be held as and when the President of AJK directs.

Autonomy and independence 
The Commission maintains complete financial independence and is not subject to any form of government regulation. The commission conducts general elections in AJK, as well as by-elections that are chosen by the Election Commission itself, without interference from the government. The commission also makes arrangements for the maintenance of law and order, creates polling plans, hires polling staff, assigns voters, and makes polling locations.

Organogram 
The AKKEC consists of the Chief Election Commissioner, who shall act as the Chairman and two Members. Chief Election Commissioner appointed by the President of AJK on the advice of the Chairman of the Kashmir Council and the members of Election Commission appoints the Prime Minister of Azad Jammu & Kashmir after consultation with the leader of opposition in the legislative assembly.

Chief Election Commissioners

Memebrs

Judicial review 
If an Election Commission decision has a jurisdictional flaw, is made in bad faith, or is coram non judice, which means it was made outside of the court's jurisdiction, judicial review may be requested in the High Court of Azad Jammu and Kashmir and Supreme Court of Azad Jammu and Kashmir.

See also 

 Election Commission of Pakistan
 Election Commission Gilgit-Baltistan
 Azad Jammu and Kashmir Legislative Assembly

References

External links 
 

 
Election commissions